The 1874 City of Durham by-election was fought on 13 June 1874.  The byelection was fought due to the voiding of the incumbent Liberal MP, Thomas Charles Thompson's election.  It was retained by the Liberal candidate Farrer Herschell.

References

1874 elections in the United Kingdom
1874 in England
19th century in County Durham
Politics of Durham, England
Durham, City of